The 2002 Derby City Council election took place on 2 May 2002 to elect members of Derby City Council in England. The whole council was up for election after boundary changes since the last election in 2000 had increased the number of seats by 7. The Labour Party stayed in overall control of the council.

Election result

Ward results

Abbey

Allestree

Alvaston

Arboretum

Blagreaves

Boulton

Chaddesden

Chellaston

Darley

Derwent

Littleover

Mackworth

Mickleover

Normanton

Oakwood

Sinfin

Spondon

References

2002 English local elections
2002
2000s in Derby